The San Domenico Stakes is an Australian Turf Club Group 3  Thoroughbred horse race for three-year-olds, run at set weights with penalties, over a distance of 1100 metres at Rosehill Gardens Racecourse, Sydney in August. Prizemoney is A$200,000.

History
The race is named after former champion sprinter San Domenico, winner of 4 Group 1 races including the 1949 Oakleigh Plate, 1950 George Main Stakes, 1952 Futurity Stakes and the 1952 All Aged Stakes.

Distance
1980–2007 – 1000 metres
 2008 – 1100 metres 
2009–2010 – 1000 metres
2011 onwards - 1100 metres

Grade
1980–1983 - Listed Race
1984–1985 - Group 3
1986–2004 - Group 2
2005 onwards - Group 3

Venue
1980–1983 - Randwick Racecourse
1984–1985 - Warwick Farm Racecourse
 1986 - Randwick Racecourse
1987–1989 - Warwick Farm Racecourse
 1990 - Randwick Racecourse
1991–1992 - Warwick Farm Racecourse
1993–1999 - Randwick Racecourse
 2000 - Warwick Farm Racecourse
2001–2007 - Randwick Racecourse
 2008 - Rosehill Gardens Racecourse
 2009–2010 - Randwick Racecourse
2011–2020 - Rosehill Gardens Racecourse
 2021 - Kembla Grange Racecourse

Winners

 2022 - Sweet Ride
 2021 - In The Congo
 2020 - Anders
 2019 - Exceedance
 2018 - Graff
 2017 - Pariah
 2016 - Star Turn
 2015 - Japonisme
 2014 - Nostradamus
 2013 - Va Pensiero
 2012 - Snitzerland
 2011 - Foxwedge
 2010 - Obsequious
 2009 - Shellscrape
 2008 - Duporth
 2007 - Sliding Cube
 2006 - Gold Edition
 2005 - Media
 2004 - Charge Forward
 2003 - Regimental Gal
 2002 - Star Of Florida
 2001 - Mistegic
 2000 - Zariz
 1999 - Testa Rossa
 1998 - race not held 
 1997 - General Nediym
 1996 - Sovereign State
 1995 - Our Maizcay
 1994 - Lord Jim
 1993 - Sashed
 1992 - Surtee
 1991 - Tierce
 1990 - Acecay
 1989 - Show County
 1988 - Merimbula Bay
 1987 - Omnicorp
 1986 - Gallery Level
 1985 - Let's Get Physical
 1984 - Quiet Little Drink
 1983 - Sir Dapper
 1982 - Rosebrook
 1981 - Black Shoes
 1980 - Proud Knight

See also
 List of Australian Group races
 Group races

External links 
 San Domenico Stakes (ATC)

References

Horse races in Australia
Open sprint category horse races